Persischer Marsch (Persian March), Op. 289, is a march in G minor composed by Johann Strauss II in the autumn of 1864. The composer conducted the first Viennese performance of the march in December 1864 at a festival concert in the Vienna Volksgarten to celebrate the 20th anniversary of his debut as a composer. When Naser al-Din Shah Qajar, to whom Strauss had dedicated the march, visited Vienna for the 1873 Vienna World's Fair, a military band, unable to acquire the music for the authentic Persian anthem, instead played this march as a hymn for the Shah.

References

External links

, 2012 Vienna New Year's Concert, Mariss Jansons

Compositions by Johann Strauss II
March music
1864 compositions
Music dedicated to nobility or royalty
Compositions in G minor
Orientalism